The Mordovian Ornament is a senior international figure skating competition. The inaugural edition took place on 15–18 October 2015 at the Palace of Sports in Saransk, Russia. In some years, the event is part of the ISU Challenger Series. Medals may be awarded in the disciplines of men's singles, ladies' singles, pair skating, and ice dancing.

Medalists
CS: ISU Challenger Series

Men

Ladies

Pairs

Ice dancing

References

 
International figure skating competitions hosted by Russia
ISU Challenger Series
Sport in Saransk